David Guest may refer to:

 David Guest (communist) (1911–1938), British Communist mathematician and philosopher; killed in Spanish Civil War
 David Guest (field hockey) (born 1981), Australian field hockey player
 David Guest (athlete) (born 1991), British decathlete
 David Guest (weightlifter) (born 1978), British weightlifter

See also 
 David Gest (1953–2016), American producer and UK television personality